Ashi (Avestan: 𐬀𐬴𐬌 aṣ̌i/arti) is the Avestan language word for the Zoroastrian concept of "that which is attained." As the hypostasis of "reward," "recompense," or "capricious luck," Ashi is also a divinity in the Zoroastrian hierarchy of yazatas.

Nomenclature
Avestan 'ashi' is a feminine abstract noun, deriving from the root ar-, "to allot," with a substantivizing -ta suffix, hence aṣ̌i/arti "that which is granted." In the Avesta, the term implies both material and spiritual recompense.

Although conceptually older than Zoroastrianism, Ashi has no attested equivalent in Vedic Sanskrit. The late Middle Persian equivalent as attested in the Zoroastrian texts of the 9th-12th century is ard-, which is subject to confusion with another ard for aṣ̌a/arta- "truth".

In the younger Avesta, divinified Ashi is also referred to Ashi Vanuhi or Ashi Vanghuhi (Aši vaηuhī, nominative Ašiš vaηuhī "Good Reward"), the Middle Persian equivalent of which is Ahrishwang (Ahrišwang). Ashi is also attested as a dvandvah compound as Ashi Vanghuhi-Parendi.

In scripture

In Zoroaster's revelation
Avestan ashi is already attested in the Gathas, the oldest texts of the Zoroastrianism and believed to have been composed by Zarathushtra himself. In these hymns, where the term occurs 17 times, ashi is still an abstract concept and is not yet the divinity that she would become in the younger Avesta. With the adjective "good" (hence -vanuhi), ashi occurs thrice.

In the Gathas, ashi is frequently identified with asha "truth", so for instance in Yasna 51.10 where the poet calls "truth to [him], to come with good reward." The idea being expressed here is a soteriological one, with "truth" being connected to the afterlife (see asha for details) and ashi being the appropriate recompense for the soul after death (cf. ashavan). This is also apparent in Yasna 43.5 where Ahura Mazda appoints "reward for deed and word: bad for the bad, good reward for the good." Subject to proper conduct in life, ashi is then tied to Zoroaster's concept of free will, evident for instance in Yasna 50.9 where a mortal has the power to influence his own reward.

Both asha and ashi have associations with Sraosha and Vohu Manah. Sraosha even has ashi as an epithet, he is ashivant, "possessing ashi" and obedience (=Sraosha) to Ahura Mazda brings good reward, which is "good thinking" (=Vohu Manah).

In the younger Avesta
In the younger Avesta, Ashi is unambiguously a divinity, particularly so in the hymn (Yasht 17) dedicated to her. This hymn also contains older material, and many of the verses of Yasht 17 are also found in Yasht 5, the hymn nominally invoking "the Waters" (Aban), but actually addressed to Aredvi Sura Anahita. Both Aredvi Sura and Ashi are divinities of fertility, but other verses that have martial characteristics (see below) appear out of place in a hymn to "the Waters".

As the divinity of fortune, Ashi is characterized as one who confers victory in time of battle (Yasht 17.12-13). She is also closely connected to Mithra, whom she serves as charioteer (Yasht 10.68). In the hymn to Sraosha, the divinity of obedience receives ashiio (of uncertain meaning) as a stock epithet.

Three verses of the Ard Yasht are devoted to enumerating the various kings and heroes who paid devotion to Ashi (17.23-25) and were rewarded for it. Verse 53 of the same hymn enumerates those who do not receive her favors, and this includes - besides demons - all youths that have not yet reached puberty. This is followed by two later verses (55-56) that recall a tale of Ashi hiding beneath a rock when pursued, only to be uncovered by prepubescent boys and girls. The last three verses (57-59) of the hymn describe Ashi complaining to Ahura Mazda for the shame she feels for the "prostitute's" actions (cf. Jahi).

In the day-name dedications of the Zoroastrian calendar, Ashi presides over the 25th day of the month (Siroza 25).

Iconography

On Kushan coins, Ashi appears as Ardoxšo with a cornucopia in hand.

Bibliography

 : 19f., 225f., 268ff.
 : 207–210.
 : 673–674.
 : 750–751.
 : 355–356.

Further reading

 ** ashi is mistranslated as "piety" in the introduction to this text.

Yazatas